SAVAG – Sociedade Anônima Viação Aérea Gaúcha was a Brazilian airline founded in 1946 that operated mainly in the state of Rio Grande do Sul. It was absorbed by Cruzeiro do Sul in 1966.

History 
SAVAG was founded in on November 25, 1946 in the city of Rio Grande, in the state of Rio Grande do Sul, by Augusto Otero and Gustavo Kraemer, with a concession to fly within the state of Rio Grande do Sul. Later, the concession was expanded to include the state of Santa Catarina.

In 1947 SAVAG purchased 3 Lockheed Model 18 Lodestar from Panair do Brasil and initiated services between Porto Alegre, Rio Grande, Pelotas, and Bagé. In 1948 SAVAG started flying to the north of the state was well.

SAVAG faced fierce competition from Varig and, for this reason, it had strong support from Varig's competitor in the region, Cruzeiro do Sul. It was from Cruzeiro do Sul that SAVAG purchased 2 Douglas DC-3 and it was with Cruzeiro that SAVAG established an operational partnership.

Varig, a politically more powerful player, pressured the Air Force Ministry to gradually cancel route concessions of SAVAG, alleging excessive competition. On January 1, 1966, SAVAG was bought and merged into Cruzeiro do Sul.
 
In 1953 Bagé International Airport was named in honor of Gustavo Kraemer, founder of SAVAG. Moreover, Salgado Filho International Airport in Porto Alegre was named in honor of the senator and minister Joaquim Pedro Salgado Filho, who was killed in the 1950 accident with a SAVAG aircraft.

Destinations 
In 1960 SAVAG operated in the following locations in the states of Paraná, Santa Catarina, and Rio Grande do Sul

Alegrete
Bagé – Comte. Gustavo Kraemer Airport
Carazinho
Cascavel – Cascavel Airport
Erechim – Erechim Airport
Joaçaba  – Joaçaba Airport
Passo Fundo – Lauro Kurtz Airport
Pelotas – Pelotas International Airport
Porto Alegre – Salgado Filho International Airport
Rio Grande – Rio Grande Airport
Santana do Livramento
Toledo – Toledo Airport
Uruguaiana – Ruben Berta International Airport

Fleet

Accidents and incidents 
11 January 1949: a Lockheed Model 18-10-01 Lodestar registration PP-SAC flying from Pelotas International Airport to Porto Alegre crashed just after take-off from Pelotas killing all 8 occupants. Causes are likely to have been fuel contamination.
30 June 1950: a Lockheed Model 18 Lodestar registration PP-SAA, flying from Porto Alegre to São Borja in bad weather collided against a hill, caught fire and crashed near the location of São Francisco de Assis. All 10 occupants died, including the founder of SAVAG and pilot, Gustavo Kraemer, and Joaquim Pedro Salgado Filho, senator and first Minister of Air Force in Brazil.

See also 
List of defunct airlines of Brazil

References

External links 
SAVAG accidents as per Aviation Safety Network
Timetable image for SAVAG (1957) – included in the network of Cruzeiro do Sul

Defunct airlines of Brazil
Airlines established in 1946
Airlines disestablished in 1966
1946 establishments in Brazil